Henri Achille Fould (8 April 1919 – 20 January 1950) was a French bobsledder who competed in the late 1940s. He won a bronze medal in the four-man event at the 1947 FIBT World Championships in St. Moritz.

Fould also finished 11th in the two-man event at the 1948 Winter Olympics in St. Moritz.

References

1948 bobsleigh two-man results
Bobsleigh four-man world championship medalists since 1930
Achille Fould's profile at Sports Reference.com
Achille Fould's profile at the Société Genevoise de Généalogie 

1919 births
1949 deaths
French male bobsledders
Olympic bobsledders of France
Bobsledders at the 1948 Winter Olympics